Novaya Derevnya is a rural locality (a khutor) in Dedovsky Selsoviet, Fyodorovsky District, Bashkortostan, Russia. The population was 71 as of 2010. There are 2 streets.

Geography 
Novaya Derevnya is located 16 km southwest of Fyodorovka (the district's administrative centre) by road. Dedovo is the nearest rural locality.

References 

Rural localities in Fyodorovsky District